Inscription Rock may refer to:

in the United States
 Inscription Rock (Keams Canyon, Arizona), listed on the NRHP in Arizona
 Inscription Rock (Kelleys Island, Ohio), listed on the NRHP in Ohio
Inscription Rock (Cimarron County, Oklahoma), on the Cimarron Cutoff of the Santa Fe Trail

See also
 El Morro National Monument, near Ramah, New Mexico